Saaz is a 1998 Hindi movie produced and directed by Sai Paranjpye, starring Aruna Irani and Shabana Azmi in lead roles. The plot is  allegedly based on the life of legendary singing sisters of Bollywood, Lata Mangeshkar and Asha Bhosle.

In an interview after the release of the film Asha said, "Its not true at all. To have two women in long plaits, take a couple of incidents and exaggerate them into a 3-hour film is such a waste of time." However, Paranjpye stated in an Interview that the idea of the film came from actress Shabana Azmi who asked her to make a film on a playback singer. She also said that the story of two sisters in the film brought to life is based on the emotions experienced by herself as a writer.

Plot
Mansi and Bansi, are the two daughters of a renowned singer, Vrindavan who works as a theater artist. Like their father, both are also gifted with amazing singing talent. Their father is an alcoholic and drinks too much. Due to his drinking habits, he dies one day leaving the two sisters orphaned. Mansi the elder of the two, takes Bansi to Mumbai and takes up professional singing. Soon Mansi reaches new heights of success and becomes a renowned singer. Meanwhile, Bansi is allowed to take care of home and family but soon realizes that she is also blessed with musical talent and can sing very well. Bansi expresses her desire to sing with Mansi but Mansi, out of jealousy fixes Bansi's wedding to an ill-suited man. Bansi's life becomes hell as her husband keeps torturing her physically and mentally. Mansi take up this issue and tries to sort things between the couple but it doesn't work out. Things remain the same even after Bansi's pregnancy. Mansi realizes that Kuhu (Bansi's daughter) is not safe in that house and gets the couple divorced. Mansi is shown to be in a relationship with a music director Indruneil. Indruneil is already married and has kids, but is still close to Mansi. However, things change when he spots Bansi's talent and the spark in her voice. He asks her to sing with Mansi which Bansi happily obliges, however, Mansi who seems jealous of Bansi's talent reduces her to a background singer in the main recording of the song. Bansi realizes that her sister does not want her to grow as a singer. She vows to become successful on her own without any help or support from her sister.

Bansi approaches Indruneil, and asks him to give her a chance which he does. Bansi shows off her talent and her voice mesmerizes a lot of people and she gains quick fame and appreciation, becoming far more popular than Mansi. Mansi tries to persuade Bansi to not sing for Indruneil to which she refuses. Years pass by, Indruneil who was once a popular music director now faces a downfall in his career. He is also shown to be in a live-in relationship with Bansi. Indruneil tells Bansi that he is leaving the Industry and shall go back to his hometown leaving Bansi heartbroken. Meanwhile, the rivalry between Mansi and Bansi keeps increasing as both try to outdo each other. Mansi even snatches a chance from Bansi to perform on an important national occasion.

Bansi breaks all ties with Mansi and does not speak to her for ten years. Both sisters reunite at an important occasion dedicated to their father in the same theater he used to perform. Mansi and Bansi sing together but Mansi loses her voice in between due to her terminal illness. Bansi learns that Mansi has final-stage blood cancer. Mansi dies after being remorseful for what she did to Bansi. Life moves on, Bansi's daughter Kuhu is shown to be struggling to become a popular singer just like her mother. A Man comes in both in lives of Kuhu and Bansi as a music director named Himaan Desai. Himaan treats Kuhu as his protege but actually, is in love with Bansi however Kuhu loves Himaan, when she finds out the truth, she feels heartbroken.

Bansi who is seen attracted to Himaan for some time decides to end the relationship because of Kuhu. Himaan meets with a fatal accident the same night which is witnessed by Bansi. Himaan dies in her arms. All the course of these events are shown in flashbacks which are narrated by Bansi herself to her psychiatrist (Parikshit Sahni) in the present day. After Himaan's death, Bansi lost her voice and vowed never to sing but her doctor tries his best to motivate her in his sessions. Bansi, who gets better with each session by her doctor decides to go on a foreign trip with her daughter for a change. At a function that is organized for Kuhu's performance, Bansi gains back her confidence after knowing that Kuhu has won a certain award in Mumbai. Her confidence and voice come back to life. Bansi goes on the stage and performs the same song which was sung by her father in the beginning of the film. 
Bansi sends her recording to her doctor telling him that her confidence has come back and she can finally sing now. The doctor gets overwhelmed by this and goes on to congratulate Bansi on the airport, giving her a bouquet, also asking her to know her better now as a friend and not a patient. Bansi smiles and obliges and the two leave the airport together.

Cast
 Shabana Azmi as Bansi Vrindavan
 Aruna Irani as Mansi Vrindavan
 Raghuvir Yadav as  Vrindavan
 Aditi Deshpande as Vrindavan's wife
 Parikshit Sahni as Dr. Ranjeet Saamarth
 Ayesha Dharkar as Kuhu Vrindavan
Zakir Hussain as Himaan Desai
  Hemu aka Hemchandra Adhikari as Joshi 
 Amar Talvar as Indranil
 Madhavi Shyete as Shevu aka Shevanta
 Brijbhushan Sahni as Bansi's husband kuhu's father
 Vadehi Varerkar as Young Mansi
 Yogita Deshpande as Young Bansi
Shruti Bhide as Young Kuhu 
[Arun Hornekar as Journalist

Music Tracks
The film has ten songs. The music score is provided by Zakir Hussain, Bhupen Hazarika, Raj Kamal and Yashwant Dev. Javed Akhtar won National Film Award for Best Lyrics.
 "Aaj Hum Roshan Karenge" - Sung By Devaki Pandit
 "Baadal Chaandi Barsaaye" - Sung by  Devaki Pandit, Jyotsna Hardikar (Bhupen Hazarika)
 "Baadal Ghumad Badh Aaye" - Sung by Kavita Krishnamurthy & Suresh Wadkar
 "Jai Veera"  - Sung by Suresh Wadkar
 "Kya Tumne Hai Keh Diya" - Sung by Kavita Krishnamurthy (Zakir Hussain)
 "Nindiya Hai Sapna Hai" - Sung by Kavita Krishnamurthy
 "Phir Bhor Bhayee" - Sung By Devaki Pandit (Zakir Hussain)
 "Raat Dhalne Lagi" - Sung by Kavita Krishnamurthy
 "Rama Bhaj Rama Bhaj" - Sung By Devaki Pandit
 "Sunne Wale Sun" - Sung by Suresh Wadkar, Shraddha Pandit, Shweta Pandit

References

External links
 

1990s Hindi-language films
1998 films
Films scored by Raj Kamal
Films directed by Sai Paranjpye